Karl Marx's theory of alienation describes the estrangement (German: Entfremdung) of people from aspects of their human nature (Gattungswesen, 'species-essence') as a consequence of the division of labor and living in a society of stratified social classes. The alienation from the self is a consequence of being a mechanistic part of a social class, the condition of which estranges a person from their humanity.

The theoretical basis of alienation is that the worker invariably loses the ability to determine life and destiny when deprived of the right to think (conceive) of themselves as the director of their own actions; to determine the character of said actions; to define relationships with other people; and to own those items of value from goods and services, produced by their own labour. Although the worker is an autonomous, self-realized human being, as an economic entity this worker is directed to goals and diverted to activities that are dictated by the bourgeoisie—who own the means of production—in order to extract from the worker the maximum amount of surplus value in the course of business competition among industrialists.

In the Economic and Philosophic Manuscripts of 1844 (1932), Karl Marx expressed the Entfremdung theory—of estrangement from the self. Philosophically, the theory of Entfremdung relies upon The Essence of Christianity (1841) by Ludwig Feuerbach, which states that the idea of a supernatural god has alienated the natural characteristics of the human being. Moreover, Max Stirner extended Feuerbach's analysis in The Ego and its Own (1845) that even the idea of 'humanity' is an alienating concept for individuals to intellectually consider in its full philosophic implication. Marx and Friedrich Engels responded to these philosophical propositions in The German Ideology (1845).

Types of alienation 
In a capitalist society, a worker's alienation from their humanity occurs because the worker can express labour—a fundamental social aspect of personal individuality—only through a private system of industrial production in which each worker is an instrument: i.e., a thing, not a person. In the "Comment on James Mill" (1844), Marx explained alienation thus: Let us suppose that we had carried out production as human beings. Each of us would have, in two ways, affirmed himself, and the other person. (i) In my production I would have objectified my individuality, its specific character, and, therefore, enjoyed not only an individual manifestation of my life during the activity, but also, when looking at the object, I would have the individual pleasure of knowing my personality to be objective, visible to the senses, and, hence, a power beyond all doubt. (ii) In your enjoyment, or use, of my product I would have the direct enjoyment both of being conscious of having satisfied a human need by my work, that is, of having objectified man's essential nature, and of having thus created an object corresponding to the need of another man's essential nature ... Our products would be so many mirrors in which we saw reflected our essential nature.

In the Economic and Philosophic Manuscripts of 1844 (1844/1932), Marx identified four types of alienation that occur to the worker labouring under a capitalist system of industrial production. They are alienation of the worker from their product, from the act of production, from their Gattungswesen ('species-essence') and from other workers.

From their product 

The design of the product and how it is produced are determined, not by the producers who make it (the workers), nor by the consumers of the product (the buyers), but by the capitalist class who besides accommodating the worker's manual labour also accommodate the intellectual labour of the engineer and the industrial designer who create the product in order to shape the taste of the consumer to buy the goods and services at a price that yields a maximal profit. Aside from the workers having no control over the design-and-production protocol, alienation (Entfremdung) broadly describes the conversion of labour (work as an activity), which is performed to generate a use value (the product), into a commodity, which—like products—can be assigned an exchange value. That is, the capitalist gains control of the manual and intellectual workers and the benefits of their labour, with a system of industrial production that converts said labour into concrete products (goods and services) that benefit the consumer. Moreover, the capitalist production system also reifies labour into the "concrete" concept of "work" (a job), for which the worker is paid wages—at the lowest-possible rate—that maintain a maximum rate of return on the capitalist's investment capital; this is an aspect of exploitation. Furthermore, with such a reified system of industrial production, the profit (exchange value) generated by the sale of the goods and services (products) that could be paid to the workers is instead paid to the capitalist classes: the functional capitalist, who manages the means of production; and the rentier capitalist, who owns the means of production.

From the act of production 

In the capitalist mode of production, the generation of products (goods and services) is accomplished with an endless sequence of discrete, repetitive motions that offer the worker little psychological satisfaction for "a job well done." By means of commodification, the labor power of the worker is reduced to wages (an exchange value); the psychological estrangement (Entfremdung) of the worker results from the unmediated relation between his productive labor and the wages paid to him for the labor. The worker is alienated from the means of production via two forms: wage compulsion and the imposed production content. The worker is bound to unwanted labour as a means of survival, labour is not "voluntary but coerced" (forced labor). The worker is only able to reject wage compulsion at the expense of their life and that of their family. The distribution of private property in the hands of wealth owners, combined with government enforced taxes compel workers to labor. In a capitalist world, our means of survival is based on monetary exchange, therefore we have no other choice than to sell our labour power and consequently be bound to the demands of the capitalist. 

The worker "[d]oes not feel content but unhappy, does not develop freely his physical and mental energy but mortifies his body and ruins his mind. The worker therefore only feels himself outside his work, and in his work feels outside himself;" "[l]abor is external to the worker," it is not a part of their essential being. During work, the worker is miserable, unhappy and drained of their energy, work "mortifies his body and ruins his mind." The production content, direction and form are imposed by the capitalist. The worker is being controlled and told what to do since they do not own the means of production they have no say in production, "labor is external to the worker, i.e. it does not belong to his essential being. A person's mind should be free and conscious, instead it is controlled and directed by the capitalist, "the external character of labor for the worker appears in the fact that it is not his own but someone else's, that it does not belong to him, that in it he belongs, not to himself, but to another." This means he cannot freely and spontaneously create according to his own directive as labor's form and direction belong to someone else.

From their Gattungswesen (species-essence) 
The Gattungswesen ('species-essence' or 'human nature'), of individuals is not discrete (separate and apart) from their activity as a worker and as such species-essence also comprises all of innate human potential as a person. 

Conceptually, in the term species-essence, the word species describes the intrinsic human mental essence that is characterized by a "plurality of interests" and "psychological dynamism," whereby every individual has the desire and the tendency to engage in the many activities that promote mutual human survival and psychological well-being, by means of emotional connections with other people, with society. The psychic value of a human consists in being able to conceive (think) of the ends of their actions as purposeful ideas, which are distinct from the actions required to realize a given idea. That is, humans are able to objectify their intentions by means of an idea of themselves as "the subject" and an idea of the thing that they produce, "the object." Conversely, unlike a human being an animal does not objectify itself as "the subject" nor its products as ideas, "the object," because an animal engages in directly self-sustaining actions that have neither a future intention, nor a conscious intention. Whereas a person's Gattungswesen does not exist independently of specific, historically conditioned activities, the essential nature of a human being is actualized when an individual—within their given historical circumstance—is free to subordinate their will to the internal demands they have imposed upon themselves by their imagination and not the external demands imposed upon individuals by other people.

Relations of production 
Whatever the character of a person's consciousness (will and imagination), societal existence is conditioned by their relationships with the people and things that facilitate survival, which is fundamentally dependent upon cooperation with others, thus, a person's consciousness is determined inter-subjectively (collectively), not subjectively (individually), because humans are a social animal. In the course of history, to ensure individual survival societies have organized themselves into groups who have different, basic relationships to the means of production. One societal group (class) owned and controlled the means of production while another societal class worked the means of production and in the relations of production of that status quo the goal of the owner-class was to economically benefit as much as possible from the labour of the working class. In the course of economic development when a new type of economy displaced an old type of economy—agrarian feudalism superseded by mercantilism, in turn superseded by the Industrial Revolution—the rearranged economic order of the social classes favored the social class who controlled the technologies (the means of production) that made possible the change in the relations of production. Likewise, there occurred a corresponding rearrangement of the human nature (Gattungswesen) and the system of values of the owner-class and of the working-class, which allowed each group of people to accept and to function in the rearranged status quo of production-relations.

Despite the ideological promise of industrialization—that the mechanization of industrial production would raise the mass of the workers from a brutish life of subsistence existence to honorable work—the division of labour inherent to the capitalist mode of production thwarted the human nature (Gattungswesen) of the worker and so rendered each individual into a mechanistic part of an industrialized system of production, from being a person capable of defining their value through direct, purposeful activity. Moreover, the near-total mechanization and automation of the industrial production system would allow the (newly) dominant bourgeois capitalist social class to exploit the working class to the degree that the value obtained from their labour would diminish the ability of the worker to materially survive. Hence [?], when the proletarian working-class become a sufficiently developed political force, they will effect a revolution and re-orient the relations of production to the means of production—from a capitalist mode of production to a communist mode of production. In the resultant communist society, the fundamental relation of the workers to the means of production would be equal and non-conflictual because there would be no artificial distinctions about the value of a worker's labour; the worker's humanity (Gattungswesen) thus respected, men and women would not become alienated.

In the communist socio-economic organization, the relations of production would operate the mode of production and employ each worker according to their abilities and benefit each worker according to their needs. Hence, each worker could direct their labour to productive work suitable to their own innate abilities, rather than be forced into a narrowly defined, minimum-wage "job" meant to extract maximal profit from individual labour as determined by and dictated under the capitalist mode of production. In the classless, collectively-managed communist society, the exchange of value between the objectified productive labour of one worker and the consumption benefit derived from that production will not be determined by or directed to the narrow interests of a bourgeois capitalist class, but instead will be directed to meet the needs of each producer and consumer. Although production will be differentiated by the degree of each worker's abilities, the purpose of the communist system of industrial production will be determined by the collective requirements of society, not by the profit-oriented demands of a capitalist social class who live at the expense of the greater society. Under the collective ownership of the means of production, the relation of each worker to the mode of production will be identical and will assume the character that corresponds to the universal interests of the communist society. The direct distribution of the fruits of the labour of each worker to fulfill the interests of the working class—and thus to an individuals own interest and benefit—will constitute an un-alienated state of labour conditions, which restores to the worker the fullest exercise and determination of their human nature.

From other workers 
Capitalism reduces the labour of the worker to a commercial commodity that can be traded in the competitive labour-market, rather than as a constructive socio-economic activity that is part of the collective common effort performed for personal survival and the betterment of society. In a capitalist economy, the businesses who own the means of production establish a competitive labour-market meant to extract from the worker as much labour (value) as possible in the form of capital. The capitalist economy's arrangement of the relations of production provokes social conflict by pitting worker against worker in a competition for "higher wages", thereby alienating them from their mutual economic interests; the effect is a false consciousness, which is a form of ideological control exercised by the capitalist bourgeoisie through its cultural hegemony. Furthermore, in the capitalist mode of production the philosophic collusion of religion in justifying the relations of production facilitates the realization and then worsens the alienation (Entfremdung) of the worker from their humanity; it is a socio-economic role independent of religion being "the opiate of the masses".

Philosophical significance and influences 

In Marxist theory, Entfremdung ('alienation') is a foundational proposition about man's progress towards self-actualisation. In the Oxford Companion to Philosophy (2005), Ted Honderich described the influences of Georg Wilhelm Friedrich Hegel and Ludwig Feuerbach upon Karl Marx: For Hegel, the unhappy consciousness is divided against itself, separated from its "essence", which it has placed in a "beyond".

As used by philosophers Hegel and Marx, the reflexive German verbs entäussern ('to divest one's self of') and entfremden ('to become estranged') indicate that the term alienation denotes self-alienation: to be estranged from one's essential nature. Therefore, alienation is a lack of self-worth, the absence of meaning in one's life, consequent to being coerced to lead a life without opportunity for self-fulfillment, without the opportunity to become actualized, to become one's self.

In The Phenomenology of Spirit (1807), Hegel described the stages in the development of the human Geist ('spirit'), by which men and women progress from ignorance to knowledge, of the self and of the world. Developing Hegel's human-spirit proposition, Marx said that those poles of idealism—"spiritual ignorance" and "self-understanding"—are replaced with material categories, whereby "spiritual ignorance" becomes "alienation" and "self-understanding" becomes man's realisation of his Gattungswesen (species-essence).

Entfremdung and the theory of history 

In Part I: "Feuerbach – Opposition of the Materialist and Idealist Outlook" of The German Ideology (1846), Karl Marx said the following:Things have now come to such a pass that the individuals must appropriate the existing totality of productive forces, not only to achieve self-activity, but also, merely, to safeguard their very existence.

That humans psychologically require the life activities that lead to their self-actualisation as persons remains a consideration of secondary historical relevance because the capitalist mode of production eventually will exploit and impoverish the proletariat until compelling them to social revolution for survival. Yet, social alienation remains a practical concern, especially among the contemporary philosophers of Marxist humanism. In The Marxist-Humanist Theory of State-Capitalism (1992), Raya Dunayevskaya discusses and describes the existence of the desire for self-activity and self-actualisation among wage-labour workers struggling to achieve the elementary goals of material life in a capitalist economy.

Entfremdung and social class 

In Chapter 4 of The Holy Family (1845), Marx said that capitalists and proletarians are equally alienated, but that each social class experiences alienation in a different form: The propertied class and the class of the proletariat present the same human self-estrangement. But the former class feels at ease and strengthened in this self-estrangement, it recognizes estrangement as its own power, and has in it the semblance of a human existence. The class of the proletariat feels annihilated, this means that they cease to exist in estrangement; it sees in it its own powerlessness and in the reality of an inhuman existence. It is, to use an expression of Hegel, in its abasement, the indignation at that abasement, an indignation to which it is necessarily driven by the contradiction between its human nature and its condition of life, which is the outright, resolute and comprehensive negation of that nature. Within this antithesis, the private property-owner is therefore the conservative side, and the proletarian the destructive side. From the former arises the action of preserving the antithesis, from the latter the action of annihilating it.

Criticism 
In discussion of "aleatory materialism" (matérialisme aléatoire) or "materialism of the encounter," French philosopher Louis Althusser criticized a teleological (goal-oriented) interpretation of Marx's theory of alienation because it rendered the proletariat as the subject of history; an interpretation tainted with the absolute idealism of the "philosophy of the subject," which he criticized as the "bourgeois ideology of philosophy".

See also 
 Commodity fetishism
Critique of political economy
 Cultural evolution
 Theories of class consciousness and reification by Georg Lukács
 The Society of the Spectacle

References

Further reading 
Althusser, Louis. 1965. For Marx. Verso.
 Avineri, Shlomo. Hegel's Philosophy of Right and Hegel's Theory of the Modern State.
 Axelos, Kostas. Alienation and Techne in the Thought of Karl Marx.
 Blackledge, Paul. 2008. "Marxism and Ethics." International Socialism 120.
 Cohen, G. A. 1977. "Alienation and Fetishism." Ch. 5 in Karl Marx's Theory of History: A Defence.
 Dahms, Harry. 2006. "Does "Alienation" Have a Future? – Recapturing the Core of Critical Theory." In The Evolution of Alienation.
 Elster, Jon. 1985. Making Sense of Marx.
 Geras, Norman. Marx and Human Nature: Refutation of a Legend. — discusses alienation and the related concept of human nature.
 Gouldner, Alvin W. 1980. "Alienation: From Hegel to Marx." Pp. 177–98 in The Two Marxisms. New York: Oxford University Press.
 Langman, Lauren, and Devorah K. Fishman, eds. 2006. The Evolution of Alienation: Trauma, Promise, and the Millennium. Lanham.
 Mandel, Ernest. 1970. "The Causes of Alienation." International Socialist Review 31(3):19–23, 49–50.
 Mandel, Ernest, and George Novack. 1973. The Marxist Theory of Alienation (2nd ed.).
 Marcuse, Herbert. 1941. Reason and Revolution: Hegel and the Rise of Social Theory.
 Mészáros, István. 1970. Marx's Theory of Alienation.
 —— Lukács' The Young Hegel and Origins of the Concept of Alienation.
 Ollman, Bertell. 1976. Alienation: Marx's Conception of Man in Capitalist Society (2nd ed.). Cambridge University Press.
 Pappenheim, Fritz. 1964. "Alienation in American Society." Monthly Review 52(2).
 Plamenatz, John. 1975. Karl Marx's Philosophy of Man.
Schacht, Richard. 1970. Alienation.
 Wolff, Jonathan. Why Read Marx Today? — an introduction to the concept and types of Entfremdung.
 Wood, Allen W. "Part I: Alienation of Karl Marx." In The Arguments of the Philosophers.
 "Alienation," Glossary of Terms. Encyclopaedia of Marxism.
 "Ludwig Feuerbach." Encyclopaedia of Marxism.

External links 
 Warburton, Nigel. 19 January 2015. "Karl Marx on Alienation," narrated by Gillian Anderson. A History of Ideas. UK: BBC Radio 4.

Labour economics
Marxist theory
Social theories